Orange oil tyres are rubber tyres manufactured by the Yokohama Rubber Company.  The manufacturer claims that the tyres use orange oil in place of part of the petroleum usually used.
Yokohama called the compound "Super Nano-Power Rubber Compound (SNPR)".

References

External links
 
 

Tires